Established in 1875, Government Mohindra College Patiala, Punjab, India is the oldest institution of contemporary higher learning in Northern India.

Mohindra College was the first institution in Punjab to receive A++ grade from the National Assessment and Accreditation Council of the Government of India. It has been ranked as number one college in India by the National Assessment and Accreditation Council in 2016 with highest CGPA of 3.86 which is highest in college section in India. The college offers undergraduate and graduate level education in basic sciences, political science, languages, history, public administration, commerce, computer applications, law,  agriculture science, biotechnology, and clinical diagnostics.

Faculties

Faculty of Arts: 22 departments

Campus
The  Mohindra College campus is outside the Patiala walled city opposite the National Institute of Sports, Patiala.

The college facilities include the Central Library, the Computer Center, the Health Center, the girls hostel, an auditorium with a seating capacity of 600, a botanical garden and elaborate sports infrastructure, particularly for cricket and swimming.

History

Then Viceroy of India Lord Northbrook laid the foundation stone for the main building of the college in 1875. It was named after Maharaja Mahendra Singh of Patiala, (also spelled as Mohindar Singh) when he died suddenly in 1876. Mohindra College was initially affiliated to the University of Calcutta; at the time, Calcutta was the capital of British Raj.

In 1882 the University of Punjab was established in Lahore, and Mohindra College became one of its first affiliated colleges. Following the partition of India in 1947, the college came under purview of the Punjab University, Chandigarh and, in 1962, under the Punjabi University of Patiala.

Principals

 Shri Joginder Nath Mukerjee  1881 to 1886
 Shri Dwarka Das  1886 to 1888
 Shri Atul Krishna Ghosh  1888 to 1906
 Shri E. Candler 1906 to 1915 (a novelist and travel writer)
 Shri T.L. Vaswani  1915 to 1919
 Shri Manmohan  1919 to 1921
 Shri A.K. Sharma  1921 to 1927
 Shri Vishwa Nath 1927 to 1927
 Shri B.N. Khosla 1927 to 1945
 Shri H.K. Bhattacharya  1945 to 1949
 Shri Teja Singh 1949 to 1952 (an eminent scholar and writer)
 Dr. Hardit Singh Dhillon  1952 to 1953
 Shri A.R. Khanna  1953 to 1957
 Shri K.L. Malhotra  1957 to 1958
 Dr. G.L. Bakhshi  1958 to 1962
 Shri M.L. Khosla  1962 to 1967
 Dr. Bhagat Singh  1967 to 1972
 Shri Gursewak Singh  1972 to 1976 (great sportsperson and educationist)
 Shri Umrao Singh  1976 to 1977
 Shri Harbakhsh Singh  1980 to 1982
 Dr. Jogindar Singh  1982 to 1987
 Dr. Gian Singh Mann 1987 to 1988
 Dr. Ujagar Singh Banga  1988 to 1989
 Shri Sarvjit Singh Gill 1989 to 1989
 Shri Parkash Singh  1991 to 1991
 Shri Mukhtiar Singh  1992 to 1996
 Shri Parminder Singh Sidhu  1996 to 1996 June
 Dr. S.K. Sarad  1996 to 1997 September
 Shri M.M. Singh  2000 to 2000 May
 Shri Sarwan Singh Chohan  2000 to 2000 October
 Dr. Vidwan Singh Soni  2000 to 2001 October (an eminent physicist, prehistorian & a popular science writer)
 Dr. Raj Kumar Sharma  2001 to 2005 April
 Dr. Daljit Inder Singh Brar  May 2005 to July 2009
 Dr. Sudeep Bhangoo 12 August 2009 to February 2011
 Dr. Roopa Saini March 2011 to November 2012 (World cup gold medalist and Arjuna Award winner)
 Dr. Sukhbir Singh Thind November 2012 to July 2017
 Dr. Sangeeta Handa July 2017 to June 2019
 Smt. Harpal Kaur June 2019 to October 2019
 Dr. Simrat Kaur October 2019 till present
Shri Atul Krishna Ghosh was the longest serving Principal and instrumental in most of the early development works of this college. He was MA, Esq in English and was Professor of English with high credential. To make way for his British successor E Candler who was a journalist basically and was based in Bengal then and also his life was in danger from revolutionaries, Sri Ghosh was transferred to Muir College, Allahabad. He spent his last phase of his life in Allahabad in the company of Sri Motilal Nehru and Sri Madan Mohan Malaviya silently working for the freedom movement of India. The matter regarding his super-cession in Mohindra College, Patiala by Candler was even raised in British Parliament then, the transcript of which is preserved in British Library archive. He wrote several books and commentaries but because of later days association with the freedom movement, Britishers underplayed, suppressed and destroyed his records of achievements. He was great educationist and in those days appointed from Indian Education Service.

("Shri" is a term used in India as a title of respect.)

Funding

Mohindra College is funded by the Punjab Government and the University Grants Commission (India) while the campus is maintained by the Public Works Department of the State Government.

The college offers financial assistance to the economically disadvantaged sections of society. Undergraduate tuition is exempt for girls.

Women represent over half of the 200 member faculty while about a third of the faculty holds doctoral and post-doctoral credentials.

Trivia
A commemorative postage stamp on Mohindra College, Patiala was issued by the Government of India on 14 March 1988.

Principal from 1910 to 1914, Edmund Candler was also a noted novelist and travel writer. His novels Siri Ram: Revolutionist and Abdication are set partly in a college in the fictional town of Gandeshwar, which is probably based on Mohindra College.

External links
 Mohindra College webpage on Patialavi.com
 General Info about Mohindra College, Patiala
 Stamp on Mohindra College, Patiala
 Android App of Mohindra College, Patiala

Universities and colleges in Punjab, India
Education in Patiala